Josef Julius Wecksell (19 March 1838 – 9 August 1907) was a Finnish poet and playwright.

Biography
Wecksell was born at Turku, Finland. He was the son of the hatter Johan Wecksell and Sofia Ulrika Björkelund. From 1858, he studied at the Imperial Alexander University.

He wrote a variety of poems, dramas and plays. In 1860 he published his first collection of poems. His historic drama Daniel Hjort  was first performed in November 1862 at the Swedish Theatre (Nya Teatern) in Helsinki. It later formed the basis for the opera Daniel Hjort by composer Selim Palmgren (1878–1951) which was performed first time on April 21, 1910. His poems were later set to music by composer Jean Sibelius.

He suffered from severe melancholy from the early 1860s and was first committed to a private psychiatric hospital in Endenich  near Cologne. In 1865, he entered Lappvik asylum (Lapinlahden sairaala) in the Lapinlahti suburb of Helsinki where he remained until his death.

In 1969, a statue of him was erected at the entrance to Åbo Akademi University.

Works
Valda ungdomsdikter, Frenckellska Boktryckeriet, 1860.
 
Viisi runoa, pseudonym Irene Mendelin, Kansanvalistus-seura, 1894. 
Tre friare: Skämt i en akt med sång, Tryckeri- och tidnings, 1931.

Plays
Daniel Hjort; reprint Love kirjat, 1981,

References

Further reading

External links
 

1838 births
1907 deaths
People from Turku
University of Helsinki alumni
Swedish-speaking Finns
Writers from Southwest Finland
Finnish poets in Swedish
Finnish dramatists and playwrights
19th-century Finnish poets
19th-century Finnish dramatists and playwrights
Finnish male poets
19th-century male writers